Weißer See is a lake in Brandenburg, Germany. The Sacrow–Paretz Canal flows through the lake.

Lakes of Brandenburg
Geography of Potsdam
Federal waterways in Germany